The 1850 United States elections occurred part way through Whig President Millard Fillmore's term, during the Second Party System. Fillmore had become president on July 9, 1850, upon the death of his predecessor, Zachary Taylor. Members of the 32nd United States Congress were chosen in this election. Democrats kept control of both houses of Congress.

In the House, Democrats won several seats from the Whigs, building on their control of the chamber. Several supporters of the Georgia Platform also won election as Unionists.

In the Senate, Whigs lost a small number of seats to Democrats and the Free Soil Party. Democrats retained a strong majority.

See also
1850–51 United States House of Representatives elections
1850–51 United States Senate elections

References

1850 elections in the United States
1850
United States midterm elections